The IBSF World Snooker Championship (also known as the World Amateur Snooker Championship) is the premier non-professional snooker tournament in the world.  The event series is sanctioned by the International Billiards and Snooker Federation. A number of IBSF champions have gone on to successful careers in the Pro ranks, notably Jimmy White (1980), James Wattana (1988), Ken Doherty (1989), Stuart Bingham (1996), Marco Fu (1997), Stephen Maguire (2000) and Mark Allen (2004).  Both Ken Doherty (in 1997) and Stuart Bingham (in 2015) have gone on to win the professional World Snooker Championship .

History
The IBSF World Snooker Championship tournament was first held in 1963. In the first two tournaments, the title was decided alone on group stages. From 1968 until now, the group stage was followed by a knock-out stage. The tournament has been held annually since 1984.

However, 2005 IBSF World Snooker Championship was cancelled, due to an earthquake in Pakistan where the event was due to be held. Instead in February/March 2006, a new tournament with the name IBSF World Grand Prix was held in Prestatyn, Wales as the qualification for a place on 2006/2007 World Snooker Main Tour, although the winner wasn't called World Champion.

In 2007 an all-Thailand final saw Atthasit Mahitthi defeat Passakorn Suwannawat 11–7. At the 2008 championship in Wels, Austria, Thepchaiya Un-Nooh of Thailand defeated Ireland's Colm Gilcreest 11–7. The 2009 event was held in Hyderabad, India, and won by Alfie Burden of England, 10–8 against Igor Figueiredo of Brazil. The 2010 event was held in Damascus, Syria, and won by Dechawat Poomjaeng of Thailand, defeating India's Pankaj Advani. The 2011 Championship was held from November 28 to December 3 in Bangalore, India. The final was won by 17-year-old Iranian Hossein Vafaei, defeating Lee Walker of Wales 10–9. In 2014, fourteen-year-old Yan Bingtao beat Pakistan's Muhammad Sajjad 8–7 to become the youngest ever world champion in snooker.

Men's finals

Champions by country

Women's finals

IBSF World 15 Reds & Team Snooker Championships

See also
 World Snooker Tour
 IBSF World Under-21 Snooker Championship
 IBSF World Under-18 Snooker Championship

Notes

References

Snooker amateur competitions
Recurring sporting events established in 1963
1963 establishments in India
World championships in snooker